The Unsigned Guide is an online contacts directory and careers guide for the UK music industry. Founded in 2003, and first published as a printed directory, The Unsigned Guide became an online only resource in November 2011. It is produced specifically for emerging bands, artists, music managers, and the UK music industry and contains directory listings covering all aspects of the business from record labels, music publishers, PR companies, recording studios, managers to radio stations, venues, gig promoters, festivals and music distribution.

Listings contain a wide range of contact information containing a contact name, email address, website, social media links, postal address and telephone number. Every listing also includes a paragraph of relevant information about the company or organisation.

Publishing details 
The Unsigned Guide is published by mcr:music. When a printed directory The Unsigned Guide was published and revised every 12–15 months. Now an online only directory the contact listings are constantly updated throughout the year.

Staff
 General Manager & Editorial: Louise Dodgson 
 Brand Partnerships & Licensing: Stef Loukes
 Research Manager: Jamie Hamilton

Edition details
 North West Edition 1 (2003)
 North West Edition 2 (2004)
 Greater London Edition (2005)
 UK Edition 1 (2006)
 UK Edition 2 (2007)
 UK Edition 3 (2008)
 UK Edition 4 (2010)
 The Unsigned Guide Online (2011)

Full contents
The Unsigned Guide directory spans 50 areas of the music industry including:

ARTIST MANAGERS
 Artist Managers
 Online Management Tools

CREATIVE & BRANDING
 Artwork & Design
 Merchandise
 Music Photography
 Online Merchandise Services
 Printers
 Video Production
 Web Tools & Hosting

LIVE
 Booking Agents
 Festivals
 Promoters
 Venues
 Live Tools & Resources
 Music Awards & Competitions
 Tour Services

MEDIA
 Radio Stations
 Music PR & Plugging
 National Press/Magazines
 Regional Press/Magazines
 Student Media
 Online Magazines & Blogs
 Regional Music Websites & Forums
 Social Media & Networking

SELLING & DISTRIBUTING YOUR MUSIC
 Distributors
 Digital Stores & Distribution Tools
 Digital Music Players
 Record Shops

MUSIC PUBLISHING
 Music Publishers
 Online Licensing & Songwriting Resources

RECORD LABELS
 Record Labels
 Online A&R Directories

RECORDING & PRODUCTION
 Producers
 Recording Studios
 Rehearsal Rooms
 Mastering/Duplication
 Equipment Hire
 Instrument Shops/Repair
 Online Recording & Production Tools

FINANCE, LAW & MUSIC BUSINESS
 Insurance Services
 Lawyers/Legal Advice
 Music & Business Advice
 Music Industry News & Commentary

MUSIC TRAINING & CAREERS
 Music Training & Tuition
 Industry Seminars & Conventions
 Careers & Jobs Websites
 Online Training & Tuition Resources

Contributions
The Advice hub is part of The Unsigned Guide which contains an archive of music business news, blogs, industry reports, advice & statistics contributed by music industry organisations such as:
 PRS Foundation
 Arts Council England
 Incorporated Society of Musicians
 Musicians' Union
 BPI
 IFPI
 Association of Independent Music
 BBC Introducing
 PRS for Music
 Music Managers Forum
 Music Producers Guild

Full UK coverage
The Unsigned Guide's directory listings cover the whole of the UK; split into 11 regions:
 Greater London
 Midlands
 North West
 North East
 East of England
 South East
 South West
 Yorkshire
 Scotland
 Northern Ireland
 Wales

Search facilities
The directory listings can be filtered by area of the music industry, region and/or city, plus a number of specialist filters for relevant categories including:
 Genres of music (Artist Managers, Distributors, Record Labels, Music Publishing, Producers)
 Capacity (Venues)
 Festival application deadline dates (Festivals)
 Radio plugging service provided (Music PR & Plugging)
 Type of radio station e.g. national, online, regional, local/community (Radio Stations)
 Type of student media e.g. TV station, radio station, magazine (Student Media)
 Type of instruments/courses provided (Music Training & Tuition)
 Type of instruments stocked/repaired (Instrument Shops/Repair)*In-house design service provided (Printers, Merchandise)
 Types of equipment provided (Rehearsal Rooms)
 Types of equipment available for hire (Equipment Hire, Rehearsal Rooms)
 Secure storage provided (Rehearsal Rooms)
 Type of Tour Services provided e.g. tour management, crew, vehicle hire, sound engineer (Tour Services)

Spotlight blog
Every month The Unsigned Guide publish their Spotlight blog championing the best new music from their talented emerging members.

Deals & Discounts
Subscribers to The Unsigned Guide to claim exclusive money-saving offers and discounts provided by select companies listed in The Unsigned Guide, covering all manner of services such as recording, rehearsals, PR campaigns, photo shoots, music video production, artwork and web design, merchandise, and more.

References

External links
 The Unsigned Guide website
 The Unsigned Guide Online website
 The Unsigned Guide news service

Defunct magazines published in the United Kingdom
Listings magazines
Magazines established in 2003
Magazines disestablished in 2011
Magazines published in Manchester
Online magazines with defunct print editions
Online music magazines published in the United Kingdom